AD 1 was the year 1  in the Julian ca

AD 1 or AD-1 may also refer to:

 AD.1 or AD Seaplane Type 1000, a British seaplane of the First World War
 Airship Development AD1, a British non-rigid gas-filled advertising airship, 1929–1931
 Douglas AD-1 Skyraider, an attack aircraft developed in the 1940s
 NASA AD-1, an oblique-wing research aircraft developed in the 1970s
 AD1, a fictional masculinist brotherhood in St Trinian's 2: The Legend of Fritton's Gold